Marinaldo dos Santos Oliveira (born 13 May 1990), commonly known as Naldo, is a Brazilian footballer who plays for Portuguesa as either a central defender or a defensive midfielder.

Career statistics

References

External links

1990 births
Living people
Sportspeople from Bahia
Brazilian footballers
Association football defenders
Association football midfielders
Esporte Clube Primeiro Passo Vitória da Conquista players
Volta Redonda FC players
Associação Atlética Ponte Preta players
Club Athletico Paranaense players
Joinville Esporte Clube players
Al-Fayha FC players
Ceará Sporting Club players
Centro Sportivo Alagoano players
Botafogo Futebol Clube (SP) players
Associação Portuguesa de Desportos players
Campeonato Brasileiro Série A players
Campeonato Brasileiro Série B players
Campeonato Brasileiro Série D players
Saudi Professional League players
Expatriate footballers in Saudi Arabia
Brazilian expatriate sportspeople in Saudi Arabia